The 1932 All-Southwest Conference football team consists of American football players chosen by various organizations for All-Southwest Conference teams for the 1932 college football season.  The selectors for the 1932 season included the Associated Press (AP).

All Southwest selections

Backs
 Blanard Spearman, TCU (AP-1 [QB])
 Bohn Hillard, Texas (AP-1 [HB])
 Harrison Stafford, Texas (AP-1 [HB])
 Ernie Koy, Texas (AP-1 [FB])

Ends
 Frank James, Baylor (AP-1)
 Madison Pruitt, TCU (AP-1)

Tackles
 Ben Boswell, TCU (AP-1)
 Foster Howell, TCU (AP-1)

Guards
 Lon Evans, TCU (AP-1)
 Johnny Vaught, TCU (AP-1)

Centers
 J. W. Townsend, TCU (AP-1)

Key
AP = Associated Press, selected by 23 conference sports editors and writers

See also
 1932 College Football All-America Team

References

All-Southwest Conference
All-Southwest Conference football teams